"I Don't Wanna Lose Your Love" is a song recorded by R&B group the Emotions for their 1976 album, Flowers. It was released a single by Columbia Records, reaching No. 13 on the Billboard Hot Soul Singles chart and No. 4 on the Billboard Hot Dance Club Play chart.

Overview
"I Don't Wanna Lose Your Love" was written by Wanda Hutchinson and Jeanette Hawes.

Critical reception
AllMusic described "I Don't Wanna Lose Your Love" as a song that "sizzled with Verdine White's classic, elastic bass".

Covers and samples
"I Don't Wanna Lose Your Love" was covered by B Angie B as the lead single of her self-titled 1991 album.

"I Don't Wanna Lose Your Love" has been covered by Maysa on her 2007 album Feel the Fire.

The song was also sampled by rock band Primal Scream on the track Loaded off their 1991 album Screamadelica and by Christina Milan featuring Twista on her 2005 track "For Real".

References

1976 songs
1976 singles
The Emotions songs
Columbia Records singles
Song recordings produced by Maurice White